Naila-Janjgir is a city and a municipality in Janjgir-Champa district in the Indian state of Chhattisgarh.

Demographics 
 ndia census,  Janjgir Naila had a population of approx 45000

Economy

There are significant lead deposits in the area of Janjgir. Most of the city's workforce is involved in the agriculture industry or in rice or flour milling. There is also some presence of a chemical industry.

Culture 

The people of Janjgir also have a great tendency towards adopting new trends and lifestyles. Janjgir thus is multicultural for people from all over India have come and settled in this region. The people of this region are very fond of colors. The dresses they wear are very colorful. Women wear sarees with Kardhani. In rural areas women wear mala made of one rupee coins. Though this has gone out of trend these days. The people of this region are also known for creating humour out of language. Comical plays are very popular and are worth watching.

Janjgir is rich in its cultural heritage. Janjgir has its own dance styles, cuisine, music."Raut Nacha" (performed basically by Yadav caste, this folk dance has won many awards at state level) and the Panthi and Soowa dance styles.

Religious places 

Vishnu Mandir was built by the kings of the Hayhay dynasty in the 12th century, but did not complete it. The temple was built in two phases. The temple is an incomplete temple which can be seen near Bhima Talab.  Hanuman temple, formally called Nahriya Baba Dham, Manka Dai mandir etc. are also in Janjgir.

Transportation 

Janjgir Naila railway station is a connected with SEC railway and its railway station is Naila.  It is well connected to the rest of the country through the Indian Railways.  The station is on the Tatanagar–Bilaspur section of Howrah-Nagpur-Mumbai line with daily connections to Mumbai, Kolkata, Pune, Nagpur, Puri, Vishakhapattnam and Ahmedabad.  Some of the daily trains passing through this station are: Gondwana Express, Chhattisgarh Express, Korba-Vishakhapattnam Express, Utkal Express, Ahmadabad Express, Shalimar Express, Shivnath Express, Trivendram Express (2 Days), etc.

Railways

The city is connected with Mumbai and Kolkata via Bilaspur, Raipur through the National Highway network. Janjgir is on NH-200 connecting Raipur and Raigarh on either side. Auto rickshaws are a popular form of transport. Local transportation also includes manpowered cycle rickshaws, tongas. There are regular buses and taxis to all nearby towns and cities.

Janjgir Aerodrome is in Khokharabhatta, 07 to 08 km away from station.

References

External links
 Janjgir Facebook
 Official website
 Janjgir website

Cities and towns in Janjgir-Champa district